Arthur Cooper (born 10 May 1952) is a Trinidad and Tobago sprinter. He competed in the men's 400 metres at the 1972 Summer Olympics.

References

1952 births
Living people
Athletes (track and field) at the 1972 Summer Olympics
Trinidad and Tobago male sprinters
Olympic athletes of Trinidad and Tobago
Place of birth missing (living people)